Goodbye to Gravity was a Romanian metalcore band from Bucharest, active from 2011 until 2015, when four of the band's five members died during their concert at a night club in Bucharest, due to a burning firework that started a large fire.

History

The band first got together in 2010, although they did not play publicly until 2011. Frontman Andrei Găluț, who had previously won the Romanian talent show Megastar on Prima TV, enlisted the help of a full band, including former members of the Romanian band Thunderstorm, to get the band going. 

In 2012 the band released their self-titled debut album to a warm reception and steadily built their reputation in Romania. As a result of the success of Goodbye to Gravity, the band were signed to Universal Music's Romanian branch, and played at festivals in countries such as Germany, Portugal and Italy. In 2015 the band set to work on their sophomore effort, with more sci-fi themes to their music. The album was announced as Mantras of War with a release date of 30 October. To celebrate the release, the group announced a free show at the Colectiv nightclub in Bucharest.

Colectiv nightclub fire

At their Mantras of War release party on 30 October 2015 at Colectiv nightclub in Bucharest, the band's firework display set a deadly fire, greatly accelerated by polyurethane foam used in the club to dampen sound waves. 64 people died, while many more were hospitalised. Vocalist Andrei Găluț, bassist Alex Pascu, and drummer Bogdan Enache (also known as Bogdan Lavinius) were hospitalised with injuries, and guitarists Vlad Țelea and Mihai Alexandru were killed in the blaze.  

Enache died on 8 November, while being transported to a hospital in Zurich, Switzerland. Pascu, who was moved to a hospital in Paris, France, and Găluț's girlfriend Mădălina Strungaru both died on 11 November. Universal Music Romania, whom the band were signed to, agreed to donate all proceeds from sales of Mantras of War to help the victims of the fire.

On the initiative of a German fan of the band, the names of the deceased musicians were engraved on a microchip on board of the NASA InSight lander. People from 230 countries were registered including 8,000 from Romania.

Discography
 Goodbye to Gravity (2012)
 Mantras of War (2015)

Band members
 Mihai Alexandru – guitars
 Bogdan Enache – drums
 Andrei Găluț – vocals
 Alex Pascu – bass
 Vlad Țelea – guitars

References

External links
 Official website for Goodbye to Gravity; accessed 16 November 2015.
 Official website archived copy as of 19 December 2014 (most recent usable snapshot; accessed 22 June 2021)
  Facebook page; accessed 22 June 2021

2015 in Romania
Metalcore musical groups
Romanian heavy metal musical groups
Musical groups established in 2011
Musical groups disestablished in 2015
Musical quintets
2011 establishments in Romania